The London and South East Women's Regional Football League is at the fifth level of the English women's football pyramid, with the seven other Regional Leagues – Eastern, Southern, South West, West Mids, East Mids, North East and North West. The London and South East Women's Regional Football League feeds directly into the FA Women's National League Division One South East, and lies above the Greater London Women's Football League and South East Counties Women's League in the pyramid. The pyramid structure was founded in 1998.

History
The London and South East Regional Women's Football League was established in 2005 and consisted of just one division, Premier Division.
The league expanded to include Division 1 North and South leagues, which sit at the six tier, which started for the 2020–21 division.

Teams

The teams competing in the London and South East Women's Regional League during the 2022–23 season are:

Premier Division

Division One North

Division One South

Champions

2005–2020

2020–Present
The league expanded to include new Division 1 North and Division South.

References

External links
London and South East Women's Regional Football League at FA Full Time

5